Afioga Tuala Tevaga Iosefo Ponifasio is a Samoan politician, lawyer and Cabinet Minister who has served as the deputy prime minister of Samoa since 2021. Elected to parliament as an independent in the 2021 election, he later joined the Faʻatuatua i le Atua Samoa ua Tasi party.

Early life 
Tuala is the eighth of ten children, born to Samoan catechists - Ponifasio Fune Ah Tani and Gafaomalietoa Telesia Mann. He attended St. Joseph's Primary School, Leauva'a, Marist Brother’s School, Mulivai, St Peter Chanel College, Moamoa and Bishop Viard College in Porirua, New Zealand. Tuala is an ex-serviceman of the Royal New Zealand Army where he held the rank of captain and is currently the President of the Royal Samoa Returned Serviceman Association.

Education 
He is a law graduate of Victoria University of Wellington, studied tertiary teaching at Auckland University of Technology, and gained a Masters in Business Administration from the Auckland Institute of Studies and Arts Administration at the University of Auckland. Tuala works as a lawyer and operates a hotel business in Apia.

Political Life 
Tuala has contested every Samoan election since 2006. Following the 2011 election he sued Samoa's TV3 for libel over a news story broadcast before the election. Following the 2016 election he was banished from his village for filing an electoral petition against the successful candidate, Sala Fata Pinati. He was subsequently convicted in 2017 of bribery and treating in a private prosecution launched by voters in the electorate, but the conviction was quashed on appeal in 2019. In September 2020 he launched a legal challenge to changes to the Electoral Act which would have advantaged incumbents and disadvantaged challengers, but dropped it when the government agreed to amend the Act.

2021 General Election 

Tuala won the Gaga'emauga No. 1 seat as an independent in the 2021 election, giving him the balance of power between the Human Rights Protection Party (HRPP) and FAST. On 21 April, after the HRPP's Tuila'epa Sa'ilele Malielegaoi had refused a demand to step down, he announced he would join the FAST Party.

Deputy prime minister (2021–present) 
On 24 May 2021, Tuala was appointed as Deputy Prime Minister and Minister of Customs and Revenue in the elected cabinet of Samoa's first female Prime Minister, Hon. Fiamē Naomi Mata‘afa. The appointment was disputed by the caretaker government. On 23 July 2021 the Court of Appeal ruled that the swearing-in ceremony was constitutional and binding, and that FAST had been the government since 24 May.

In February 2022, Tuala fired his office assistant for the alleged theft of money. He subsequently announced that he would press charges.

Notes

References

Year of birth missing (living people)
Living people
Deputy Prime Ministers of Samoa
Members of the Legislative Assembly of Samoa
Samoan chiefs
Faʻatuatua i le Atua Samoa ua Tasi politicians
Government ministers of Samoa
Samoan lawyers